Tungalagiin Mönkhtuyaa (Mongolian: Тунгалагийн Мөнхтуяа) is a female Mongolian wrestler.

References

External links
The fila-official.com profile
 The Sports.org profile

Mongolian female sport wrestlers
1988 births
Living people
World Wrestling Championships medalists
20th-century Mongolian women
21st-century Mongolian women